The 1987–88 Israel State Cup (Gvia HaMedina) was the 49th season of Israel's nationwide football cup competition and the 34th after the Israeli Declaration of Independence.

The competition was won by Maccabi Tel Aviv who have beaten Hapoel Tel Aviv 2–1 in the final.

Results

Round of 16

Quarter-finals

Semi-finals

Final

References
100 Years of Football 1906–2006, Elisha Shohat (Israel), 2006, pp. 274–5

Israel State Cup
State Cup
Israel State Cup seasons